Čapek (feminine Čapková;) is a Czech surname. Notable people with the surname include:

 František Čapek (1914–2008), Czechoslovak canoeist
 Jan Čapek of Sány (died after 1445), Czech commander of the Hussites
 Josef Čapek (1887–1945), Czech painter and writer
 Josef Čapek (footballer) (1902–1983), Czech footballer
 Karel Čapek (1890–1938), Czech journalist, writer and playwright
 Karel Matěj Čapek-Chod (1860–1927), Czech writer
 Milič Čapek (1909–1997), Czech-American philosopher
 Norbert Čapek (1870–1942) founder of the Unitarian Church in what became Czechoslovakia
 Tereza Čapková (born 1987), Czech athlete
 John Capek, Czech-Australian songwriter
 Irene Capek (1924–2006), Czech Holocaust survivor and MBE recipient

See also

 
 1931 Čapek
 Brothers Čapek
 Czapek, alternative spelling

Czech-language surnames